Claire Cox is a British actress. Her television appearances include acclaimed series The Last Salute, Fresh Meat, Spooks, Wallander and Jamestown for Sky.

Career
Cox graduated from
Central School of Speech and Drama with a B.A. in acting. One of her first jobs after graduating from drama school was playing Fredrika Armfeldt in Stephen Sondheim's A Little Night Music at The National Theatre with Judi Dench.

She then joined the Royal Shakespeare Company for the first of her three seasons with the company. She played Portia in Edward Hall's production of Julius Caesar in which she was awarded an Ian Charleson commendation. She returned to the company in the critically acclaimed Spanish Golden age season. Other theatre work includes A Servant To Two Masters (RSC), The Voysey inheritance (The National Theatre), Henry v ( Manchester Royal Exchange), The White Devil (The Chocolate Factory), The Winslow Boy (The Rose Theatre Kingston), Macbeth (The Globe), Accolade (St James') 
and The Tricycle Theatres Women, Power and Politics season which was nominated for a Whatsonstage award for Best Ensemble. 

Her Film credits include The Leading Man, Shooting Fish, Luther. And selected TV credits include The Last Salute series, Every woman knows a secret (Carnival) A Touch of Frost, Your Mother Should Know ( BBC), Spooks (Kudos), Wallander (Left Bank Pictures), Poirot, Fresh Meat and the up-and-coming new series Jamestown for Carnival and Sky.

Personal life
She is married to actor Tom Vaughan-Lawlor.

References

External links
Claire Cox on Twitter - @C1aire_Cox

Interview with Claire Cox from 2016

People from Peterborough
Living people
English film actresses
English stage actresses
English television actresses
Actresses from Cambridgeshire
Year of birth missing (living people)
21st-century English actresses
Alumni of the Royal Central School of Speech and Drama